Hans Kayser (28 June 1884, Karlsruhe — 28 November 1964, Heidelberg) was a landscape designer.

Formative years
In 1901-1903, apprenticeship in horticulture institute to Weinheim.

Assistant in the Alpine Garden of the Lord Torrevon in Geneva and then one year in Schlossgärtnerei Friedrichshof at Tronberg.

In 1904-1906, Visit of the Royal Gardeners establishment to Dahlem, Berlin.

Then until 1907 Garden technician at Gartenarchitekt Fischer in Frankfurt, and until 1908 in the Garden Center Henkel in Darmstadt.

There attended lectures at the University of Technology and the School of Applied Arts in Frankfurt, Germany.

After that half-year stay in England in the summer of 1909.

Career
In autumn 1909, he started his business as a landscape architect in Frankfurt and at the same time H. Seibert the Odenwälder crops Kayser.

References

Landscape or garden designers
Businesspeople from Karlsruhe
1884 births
1964 deaths